Smalls is a surname. Notable people with the surname include:

 Bertie Smalls (1935–2008), noted British supergrass
 Biggie Smalls, former name of The Notorious B.I.G.
 Charlie Smalls (1943–87), composer and songwriter
 Chris Smalls, American labor organizer
 Cliff Smalls (1918-2008), American jazz trombonist, pianist, conductor and arranger
 Fred Smalls (born 1963), American football linebacker
 Joan Smalls, Puerto Rican fashion model
 Robert Smalls (1839–1915), slave who, during and after the American Civil War, became a ship's pilot, sea captain and politician
 Tiger Smalls, American boxing trainer
 Tionna T. Smalls, American author and media personality
 Tommy Smalls (1926/7-72), New York radio disc jockey known as "Dr. Jive"

Fictional characters:
 Derek Smalls, bassist in the parody heavy metal band Spinal Tap
 Leonard Smalls, Lone Biker of the Apocalypse in Raising_Arizona
 Scotty "You're killin' me" Smalls, fifth-grade protagonist in The_Sandlot

See also
 Small (surname)